Michael Anthony Del Grande (born ) is a Canadian politician. Elected in 2003, he is a former Toronto city councillor, representing Scarborough—Agincourt.  He announced in February 2014 that he would not run for re-election, and instead ran for election in 2014 to the Toronto Catholic District School Board.

Background
Mike Del Grande was born and raised in Toronto, Ontario in the Danforth neighbourhood. He is the eldest child of Italian immigrants. He is married and has three children most notably John Del Grande. His early education was completed at Holy Cross and St. Aloysius Catholic Schools and has attended Neil McNeil High School and East York Collegiate Institute.

Del Grande became a member of the Canadian Institute of Chartered Accountants when he graduated from the University of Toronto in 1979. Since that time, he also received a Bachelor of Commerce and Finance degree in 1976 and a Bachelor of Education degree in 2002, both from the University of Toronto, as well as a Master's degree in Theological Studies from St. Augustine in 2000.

City councillor
In 2003, Del Grande ran for city council and defeated longtime incumbent Sherene Shaw. He was an active participant in the "Keep the Chief" campaign in 2004, when Julian Fantino, then Toronto's Chief of Police, did not have his contract renewed by the Toronto Police Services Board.

In December 2004, during a two-hour tour of his ward with Scarborough Mirror reporter David Nickle, Del Grande used the opportunity to highlight the nature of his ward; namely the difficulties of establishing a deep sense of community and trust with local services when longtime residents of the ward are moving out and are replaced by a transient and newly landed immigrant population. Del Grande said, "What's happening here is a lot of the white people are moving out."

During his 2006 re-election campaign, Del Grande was charged criminally for assault following an incident in which he allegedly held captive a female volunteer working for rival candidate John Wong; Del Grande accused the woman of removing his campaign flyers from an apartment building and prevented her from leaving until police arrived to arrest her. The charge against Del Grande was withdrawn in February, 2007.

In January 2012, Del Grande opposed breakfast programs for poor children, stating that parents who have children should take responsibility for them. Pundit Michael Shapcott stated that this was a perfect example of "blaming the victim" for their adverse situation.

School trustee
1994 - 1998, Ward 18

Del Grande was first elected as a school trustee 1994. He was re-elected in 1997 and 2000. Throughout his nine years as a school trustee, he served as the Chair of school board for one year, from 2000 to 2001.

In 1996, Del Grande was charged under Ontario labour law by the Ontario English Catholic Teachers' Association for "bargaining in bad faith" when it was alleged that he used the local media to manipulate public opinion at a time when the school board was in contract negotiations with its teachers. The charge was subsequently dropped by the association after he agreed to cease and desist.

2014 - Present, Ward 7

Del Grande was later re-elected as a school trustee after his son John, who was trustee for almost eleven years opted not to seek re-election. In 2014, he became the Chairman of the school board once more, until 2015.

On November 7, 2019, during discussions to update the TCDSB Code of Conduct to match the Ontario Human Rights Code and be more inclusive and protective of LGBTQ2S+ students by adding specific terms gender identity, gender expression, family status and marital status, Del Grande stood up to move an amendment asking for several other terms to added including bestiality, pedophilia and terms related to rape, cannibalism and vampirism to be added to the list. Facing severe backlash, including a public petition made with over 2,100 signatures as of December 2019, his proposed amendment was eventually ruled out of order and was withdrawn. Del Grande claimed he was trying to illustrate just how slippery a slope the original concept was. On an interview he said “My point was that we do not accept or view that which is not compatible with our faith ... Eight trustees deemed otherwise and I wanted to point out to them that if they want to use those same arguments … then what about all these other people that you say Jesus loves, etc? Why stop there, then? Why not continue your inclusion, if you will, on all these other terms?”. He has received calls from other trustees and members of the Toronto LGBTQ2S+ advocates to publicly apologize. Following formal public complaints, an investigation could be launched into Del Grande’s actions and potential “sanctions” could be put into place if it’s found that he breached the Board’s code of conduct.

Election results

School Board

City Council

References

External links

1954 births
Canadian accountants
Canadian people of Italian descent
Living people
Toronto city councillors
Toronto Catholic District School Board
University of Toronto alumni
Toronto Catholic District School Board trustees